Inbaal is an Israeli-born British psychic and Wiccan Priestess. She has been seen on television programs such as Big Brother's Little Brother, House Busters and Most Haunted. She has also been Elle magazine's astrologer in the UK and has acted as guest astrologer for Elle magazine in Japan on several occasions.

Inbaal originally became interested in becoming a witch during the 1990s, sparked by a love of Tarot cards. From there she developed her skills as a psychic and tarot reader.

Notable Appearances 

Inbaal has been featured by various major publications, including GQ, The Times, Elle, News of the World, the Daily Mail, and various others.

Predictions in the Media 

From May to July 2003, Inbaal appeared on Big Brother’s Little Brother, where she was part of the "Eviction Prediction" panel every Friday, her job being to predict who was to leave the house, using only her psychic ability.
She predicted more evictions correctly than any psychic on the panel.

Articles in magazines such as Woman&Home and Here's Health described Inbaal's psychic readings alongside other psychics, and her reviews have been positive, praising both her accuracy and kind manner.

She has also featured as a regular psychic presenter on Sky TV in the UK on the Psychic and Soul channel, and on the Psychic Interactive channel's various programmes.

In 2007, The Observer ran a betting competition, each week pitting a psychic against a reader or a zoo animal, and a professional sports pundit, to see who would make the highest profit from an allocated £500 with their respective sports predictions. The competitors were replaced every month.
At the end of a year, it transpired that Inbaal has done better than any of the other psychics.
As the top psychic in the competition, she was invited back for a champion-of-champions round in 2008, where she came second to Jenny McCririck, a professional sports pundit, despite having a higher hit rate than her.

Media Wiccan 

In 2004 she appeared on the Living programme Most Haunted for an episode entitled "Witchfinder General".

She appeared on Channel 4's 4thought.tv programme strand on 30 July 2010, speaking on Wicca and spells from an urban witch perspective.

She has been featured as a speaker at the annual Witchfest festivals put on by the Children of Artemis, She also appeared on the cover of Witchcraft & Wicca Magazine.

In 2022, Inbaal interviewed with Galactic Center astrologer Ellie Adams of Saturn Season for a YouTube channel called Let's F With Astrology, discussing astrological correlations in the tarot.

Criticisms

In 2009 The Guardian newspaper in the UK asked Inbaal to predict the ultimate fate of five Premiership football teams at the end of the season. It transpired that she made one correct and four incorrect predictions, but claimed that she had been asked by the newspaper not to make the "obvious choices".

References

External links 
 Inbaals Website
 

English Wiccans
Living people
Year of birth missing (living people)